Huizhou North railway station (Chinese: 惠州北站) is a railway station in Huicheng District, Huizhou, Guangdong, China. This station opened in 2021 with the Ganzhou–Shenzhen high-speed railway. An under construction extension to the Dongguan–Huizhou intercity railway will also connect to this station in the future. A spur to the under construction Guangzhou–Shanwei high-speed railway will also allow southbound trains to continue to Guangzhou.

See also
Huizhou railway station
Huizhou South railway station

References

Railway stations in Guangdong